Fahlaviyat, also spelled fahlavi, was a designation for poetry composed in the local northwestern Iranian dialects and languages of the Fahla region, which comprised Isfahan, Ray, Hamadan, Mah Nahavand, and Azerbaijan, corresponding to the ancient region of Media. Fahlaviyat is an Arabicized form of the Persian word Pahlavi, which originally meant Parthian, but now came to mean "heroic, old, ancient." According to the historians Siavash Lornejad and Ali Doostzadeh, the Fahlaviyat used in Azerbaijan was called Old Azeri.

Fahlaviyat, which was descended from Median dialects, had been substantially impacted by the Persian language, and also had linguistic similarities with the Parthian language. The oldest fahlaviyat quatrain was supposedly written in the dialect of Nahavand, by a certain Abu Abbas Nahavandi (died 942/43).

Evidence indicates that the Persian Sufis of Baghdad sang popular lyrical quatrains during their sama ceremonies in the 9th-century. The language that they sang in were likely not Arabic, but local Iranian dialects. Poets such as Homam Tabrizi (died 1314/15) and Abd al-Qadir Maraghi (died 1435) wrote in fahlaviyat.

List of authors 

The following are some authors whose works are recognized in the general genre of fahlaviyat:

 Awhadi Maraghai
 Ayn al-Quzat Hamadani
 Baba Tahir
 Safi-ad-din Ardabili
 Mama Esmat Tabrizi
 Maghrebi Tabrizi
 Humam-i Tabrizi
 Bundar Razi
 Safina-yi Tabriz

References

Sources 
 
 
 

Persian poetry